Zak Zinter (born April 17, 2001) is an American football offensive guard for the Michigan Wolverines.

College career 
In 2021, Zinter was part of Michigan's offensive line that won the Joe Moore Award. At the end of the 2022 regular season, Zinter was selected by the conference coaches as a first-team offensive guard on the 2022 All-Big Ten Conference football team. All three of Michigan's interior offensive lineman (Zinter, Olusegun Oluwatimi, and Trevor Keegan) were named to the first team by the conference coaches. He was also named to the Outland Trophy watch list.

References

External links
 Michigan Wolverines bio
 SI.com: Video Shows Zak Zinter Destroying Defenders

2001 births
Living people
American football offensive guards
Michigan Wolverines football players
People from North Andover, Massachusetts
Players of American football from Massachusetts